Kirsten Dreyer (born March 27, 1969) is an American former professional tennis player.

Biography
Raised in Connecticut, Dreyer was the national 16 and under indoor champion in 1983 and started out on the professional tour the following year as a 15 year old.

Dreyer qualified for her first Virginia Slims main draw in 1985 and featured that season in the qualifiers of three grand slam tournaments.

From 1988 to 1991 she played college tennis for the UCLA Bruins.

In 1992, her final year on tour, she made the second round at Indian Wells, with an opening round win over world number 53 Mariaan de Swardt.

ITF finals

Singles: 6 (3–3)

Doubles: 5 (3–2)

References

External links
 
 

1969 births
Living people
American female tennis players
UCLA Bruins women's tennis players
Tennis people from Connecticut